Frakt is a surname. Notable people with the surname include:

Austin Frakt, American health economist
David J. R. Frakt, American lawyer, law professor, and military officer